B4C may refer to:

 Boron carbide (molecular formula B4C)
 Chevrolet Camaro B4C, an automobile